Avery Franklin Brooks (born October 2, 1948) is an American actor, director, singer, narrator and educator. He is best known for his television roles as Captain Benjamin Sisko on Star Trek: Deep Space Nine, as Hawk on Spenser: For Hire and its spinoff A Man Called Hawk, and as Dr. Bob Sweeney in the Academy Award–nominated film American History X. Brooks has delivered a variety of other performances to a great deal of acclaim. He has been nominated for a Saturn Award and three NAACP Image Awards. Brooks has also been inducted into the College of Fellows of the American Theatre and bestowed with the William Shakespeare Award for Classical Theatre by the Shakespeare Theatre Company.

Early life
Avery Brooks was born in Evansville, Indiana, the son of Eva Lydia (née Crawford), a choral conductor and music instructor, and Samuel Brooks, a union official and tool and die worker. His maternal grandfather, Samuel Travis Crawford, was also a singer who graduated from Tougaloo College in 1901. When Avery was eight years old his family moved to Gary, Indiana, after his father had been laid off from International Harvester. Brooks has said: "I was born in Evansville...but it was Gary, Indiana, that made me."

The Brooks household was filled with music. His mother, who was among the first African-American women to earn a master's degree in music at Northwestern University, taught music wherever the family lived. His father was a member of the Wings Over Jordan Choir, an a cappella spiritual choir best known for performing on CBS radio from 1937 to 1947. His maternal uncle Samuel Travis Crawford was a member of the Delta Rhythm Boys. "Music is all around me and in me, as I am in it," Brooks has said.

Brooks attended Indiana University and Oberlin College. He later completed his Bachelor of Arts plus a  Master of Fine Arts from Rutgers University in 1976, becoming the first African American to receive an MFA in acting and directing from Rutgers.

Television career

Spenser: For Hire: Hawk
In 1985, Brooks was cast in the role of Hawk on the ABC television detective series Spenser: For Hire, based on the mystery series published by Robert Parker. Hawk became a popular character, and after three seasons, Brooks in 1989 received his own, short-lived spinoff series, A Man Called Hawk. In landing the title role, Brooks became the fourth Black-American male actor in a starring role in a first-run television drama following Bill Cosby, who co-starred with Robert Culp in the NBC spy series I Spy from 1965 to 1968, Clarence Williams III, who starred as undercover police detective Linc Hayes in the iconic ABC "hippie" cop drama The Mod Squad from 1968 to 1973, and Philip Michael Thomas, who starred opposite Don Johnson in Miami Vice.

Brooks said of his role as Hawk: "I never thought of myself as the sidekick... I've never been the side of anything. I just assumed that I was equal."

Brooks returned to play Hawk in four Spenser television movies: Spenser: Ceremony, Spenser: Pale Kings and Princes, Spenser: The Judas Goat and Spenser: A Savage Place.

Star Trek: Benjamin Sisko
Brooks is best known for his role as Benjamin Sisko on the syndicated science-fiction television series Star Trek: Deep Space Nine which ran for seven seasons from 1993 to 1999.

Brooks won the role of Commander Benjamin Sisko by beating 100 other actors from all racial backgrounds to become the first Black-American captain to lead a Star Trek series. Brooks also directed nine episodes of the series, including "Far Beyond the Stars", an episode focusing on racial injustice.

Series producer Ronald D. Moore said of Brooks: 

Brooks was nominated for a Saturn Award and two NAACP Image Awards for the role.

Other roles
In 1984, Brooks received critical praise for his featured role in PBS's American Playhouse production of Half Slave, Half Free: Solomon Northup's Odyssey, directed by Gordon Parks. The story chronicled the life of Solomon Northup, a free man from New York kidnapped and sold into slavery in 1841 and held until 1853, when he regained his freedom with the help of family and friends. It was adapted from Northup's memoir, Twelve Years a Slave (1853).

Brooks appeared in the 1985 television movie adaptation of Finnegan Begin Again.  In 1987, he starred in the role of Uncle Tom in Showtime's filmed adaptation of Uncle Tom's Cabin. Brooks was nominated for an Ace Award in the category of best Actor in a movie or miniseries for that said role. A third project that allowed Brooks to highlight the history of African Americans was his performance in the 1988 television movie Roots: The Gift, which featured his fellow Star Trek actors LeVar Burton, Kate Mulgrew, and Tim Russ.

In 1998, he appeared in the motion picture American History X, which also stars another Star Trek actor, Jennifer Lien. He also played the role of Paris in the 1998 film The Big Hit.

During 1998 he also supplied the voice of King Maximus in an episode of the animated TV series, Happily Ever After: Fairy Tales for Every Child entitled "The Golden Goose". Brooks was eventually nominated for an NAACP Image Award within the category of Outstanding Performance in a Youth or Children's Series/Special for the role. He also voiced the character of Nokkar in an episode of the Disney animated series Gargoyles.

In 2001, Brooks narrated and appeared in a series of commercials for IBM.

Other work

Teaching and cultural work
Brooks has taught at Oberlin College and Case Western Reserve University. A graduate of Livingston College and Mason Gross School of the Arts at Rutgers University, he accepted an appointment in 1976 as an associate professor of theater arts at Mason Gross.

From 1993 to 1996, Brooks was artistic director for the National Black Arts Festival in association with Rutgers University. Held annually since 1988 in Atlanta, Georgia, the internationally renowned festival celebrates African-American culture and people of African descent. In addition, Brooks has also done extensive work with the Smithsonian Institution's Program in Black American Culture.

Music
A deep baritone singer, Brooks has performed on stage with Butch Morris, Lester Bowie, and Jon Hendricks. He also recorded an album with saxophone player James Spaulding, James Spaulding Plays the Legacy of Duke Ellington (Storyville, 1977). Brooks had the lead role in the 1985 Anthony Davis opera X: The Life and Times of Malcolm X.  Also, he performed at the Paris Banlieues Bleues Festival in 2005.  In his role as Benjamin Sisko, he performed the Frank Sinatra tune "The Best Is Yet to Come" at the conclusion of the Deep Space Nine episode "Badda-Bing Badda-Bang" as a duet with James Darren.

In a brief venture into scoring, Brooks did the musical score for the final two episodes of A Man Called Hawk, which he starred in.

In 2009, Brooks released his debut album, Here, an album of jazz and blues covers, as well as spoken word. During 2016 Brooks performed in concert with the Springfield Symphony Orchestra at the Springfield Symphony Hall.
In 2020, Brooks was featured on The DX Experiment's debut album, Black In My Own Way, an album of experimental music with spoken word.

Theatre
Brooks received critical acclaim in Phillip Hayes Dean's play Paul Robeson. Brooks portrayed the life of the famous singer, actor, and civil-rights activist in a one-man, critically acclaimed biographical drama. He has performed the role since 1982 at the Westwood Playhouse in Los Angeles, the Kennedy Center in Washington, DC, and the Longacre Theater on Broadway. He also portrayed Robeson in Are You Now Or Have You Ever Been?, both on- and off-Broadway.

Brooks' early theater credits include The Offering, A PHOTOGRAPH: A Study of Cruelty, and Are You Now or Have You Ever Been? in the 1970s. He started to gain recognition after his appearance in Spell #7 at the Public/Anspache Theater in New York City in 1979. He subsequently starred in Othello at the Folger Shakespeare Festival (1985) and Fences at the Repertory Theater of St. Louis, Missouri, in 1990. He reprised the role of Othello at the Washington Shakespeare Theater in 1990–1991.

During 1994, he was inducted in the College of Fellows of the American Theatre. Brooks later appeared in the title role of The Oedipus Plays, a production that traveled to the 2003 Athens Festival in Greece. He also appeared in the title role of King Lear at Yale's Repertory Theatre. In 2005, Brooks again starred as Othello, this time at the Shakespeare Theatre Company in a production directed by renowned Michael Kahn. Brooks was one of 15 actors of the Shakespeare Theatre Company in Washington, DC, to be honored with the William Shakespeare Award for Classical Theatre in 2007. He returned to the Shakespeare Theatre Company in Fall 2007 to play the title role in Christopher Marlowe's Tamburlaine. His performance was interrupted when an injury made it necessary for him to take time off to heal.

In September 2008, Brooks played Willy Loman in a production of Death of a Salesman at Oberlin College.

During 2010, Brooks performed in Baltimore Center Stage's production of Kwame Kwei-Armah's play Let There Be Love. Once again, Brooks played the title role of Paul Robeson at the Shakespeare Theater from March 24–27 in 2011.

Films
Brooks played Dr. Bob Sweeney in American History X alongside Edward Norton. He also played mob boss Paris in The Big Hit, co-starring Mark Wahlberg. His last feature-film role was in 2001 as Detective Leon Jackson in 15 Minutes, which also starred Robert De Niro and Edward Burns.

Documentary work
Brooks has also hosted several documentaries and served as narrator in such features as the IMAX film Africa's Elephant Kingdom. His other documentary credits include narrating Earthquake!, A Passion for Faith, covering the history of black Catholics in America, Eyes on the Prize, Walking with Dinosaurs, Jesus: The Complete Story, Land of the Mammoth: Ancient Evidence, The Ballad of Big Al, The Science of Big Al, Savage Sun, Engineering the Impossible (The Colosseum), Greatest Places and Echoes from the White House, and God vs. Satan. He also narrated the three-part series Heart of Africa, consisting of Heart of Africa: Jewel of the Rift, about the lifecycles of African cichlid fish in Lake Tanganyika, Heart of Africa: Virunga, about the gorillas of Virunga National Park, and Heart of Africa: Fire and Ice, about the lowland animals of the Rift Valley.

In May 2007, Brooks recorded the narration for the documentary The Better Hour, which is about the life of William Wilberforce, the man who led the campaign for the end of slavery in the United Kingdom in the late 18th and early 19th centuries.

Brooks also provided the narration for the BBC series Walking with Dinosaurs when it aired in North America on the Discovery Channel. His deep and authoritative voice commanded viewer attention; Brooks was able to draw on his years of training as an opera singer and his extensive stage experience with Shakespeare company actors not only to engage the viewer, but also to use his vocal abilities to emphasize the events as seen in the show.

In 2009, Brooks narrated a special documentary for the National Geographic channel, titled Drain the Ocean. Using CGI animation, National Geographic simulates removing the water from the oceans to explore the ocean floor and its vast geography.

In 2011, Brooks was interviewed by William Shatner in the feature-length documentary The Captains. The film was written and directed by Shatner and features the original Star Trek captain interviewing every other actor who had portrayed a prominently recurring captain, upon whom the science-fiction franchise had yet been based. Brooks also served as music supervisor for the project.

In 2013, Brooks began to narrate the Christian or Abrahamic series The Bible's Greatest Secrets, on the American Heroes Channel, which attempted to use interpretations of events found in the Bible to illuminate new archeological findings and interpretations of history, and to use interpretations of new archeological findings to illuminate interpretations of events found in the Bible. IMDb lists the "Storyline" as: "Unlock the mysteries of vanished civilizations of the Holy Land and the people who built them."

Later projects

Brooks was part of a directors panel at a festival celebrating the work of Ntozake Shange at the New Federal Theatre on February 11, 2007. Brooks has directed Shange's Boogie Woogie Landscapes at the John F. Kennedy Center for the Performing Arts and in London's West End.

As part of BBC Audiobooks America's entry into the US market, Brooks narrated an audiobook of Alex Haley's novel Roots: The Saga of an American Family. This was the first time the novel was adapted into an audiobook. Brooks had previously starred in a 1988 television film based upon the book, Roots: The Gift. As an audio book, Roots: The Saga of an American Family won an Audie Award in 2008 within the category of Non-Fiction.

In 2007, Brooks released an album containing in his words "a selection of ballads and love songs... I speak of my respect for my father, and for artists that I have listened to all my life."

Personal life
Since 1976, Brooks has been married to Vicki Lenora Brooks, an assistant dean at Rutgers University. Together, they have three adult children – Ayana, Cabral, and Asante – and live in Princeton, New Jersey.

After police received a report of erratic driving, at around 10 PM on January 29, 2012, Brooks was arrested under charges of driving under the influence in Wilton, Connecticut (being released with a court date of February 9 that year).

In a December 27, 2020 interview with The 7th Rule Podcast on the YouTube channel Orville Nation, Cirroc Lofton indicated Brooks was not retired as an actor and would return to acting if offered a role, saying he has been blacklisted from Hollywood and is without any agent or agency.

Filmography

Film

Television

Video game

References

External links 

 
 

1948 births
Actors from Evansville, Indiana
African-American academics
African-American male actors
African-American male singers
American male Shakespearean actors
African-American television directors
American television directors
African-American theater directors
American theatre directors
American male pianists
American male film actors
American male stage actors
American male television actors
American male voice actors
Audiobook narrators
Case Western Reserve University faculty
Indiana University alumni
Living people
Male actors from Indiana
Oberlin College alumni
Rutgers University alumni
Rutgers University faculty
Academics from Indiana
People from Gary, Indiana
20th-century American pianists
African-American pianists
20th-century American male singers
20th-century American singers